The 2021 Iași Open was a professional tennis tournament played on clay courts. It was the second edition of the tournament which was part of the 2021 ATP Challenger Tour. It took place in Iași, Romania between 12 and 18 July 2021.

Singles main-draw entrants

Seeds

 1 Rankings as of 28 June 2021.

Other entrants
The following players received wildcards into the singles main draw:
  Cezar Crețu
  David Ionel
  Ștefan Paloși

The following player received entry into the singles main draw using a protected ranking:
  Matteo Donati

The following player received entry into the singles main draw as an alternate:
  Hernán Casanova

The following players received entry from the qualifying draw:
  Alexandar Lazarov
  David Poljak
  Dan Alexandru Tomescu
  Miljan Zekić

The following player received entry as a lucky loser:
  Bogdan Bobrov

Champions

Singles

 Zdeněk Kolář def.  Hugo Gaston 7–5, 4–6, 6–4.

Doubles

 Orlando Luz /  Felipe Meligeni Alves def.  Hernán Casanova /  Roberto Ortega Olmedo 6–3, 6–4.

References

2021 ATP Challenger Tour
July 2021 sports events in Romania
2021 in Romanian tennis